In polymer science, inherent viscosity is the ratio of the natural logarithm of the relative viscosity of a polymer to its mass concentration. 

Inherent viscosity is defined as  

 

The unit of inherent viscosity is dL/g.

References

Viscosity